Onsi Sawiris (also written Sawires;) (August 14, 1930 – June 29, 2021) was an Egyptian businessman. He was the patriarchal head of the Sawiris family and founder of the Orascom Group conglomerate.

Background and personal life 
Sawiris was born on August 30, 1930, in Sohag, Egypt, into an Egyptian Coptic Christian family, the son of Naguib Sawiris, a lawyer, and his wife. He was the youngest of four children.

Sawiris received a bachelor’s degree in agricultural engineering from Cairo University in 1950. After graduation, he managed his family’s 52-acre farm for two years using his newly learnt agricultural methods. After that, he moved into road construction as he saw that the government was spending money on building roads and there was money to be made there. from there, he went into other areas.

Sawiris was married to Yousriya Loza Sawiris. The couple had three sons: Naguib, Samih, and Nassef. Sawiris was Coptic Christian.

Sawiris died on June 29, 2021 in El Gouna, Egypt at the age of ninety-one due to age-related issues.

Career 
In 1952, Sawiris established his own construction company, Onsi & Lamei Co, which began as a road and waterways contractor. In 1961, the business was nationalized under then Egyptian President Gamal Abdel Nasser and later became known as the El Nasr Civil Works Company. Mr. Sawiris continued to run the nationalized business for five years.

He was prevented from leaving the country for six years in the 1960s. 

After a period of time in Libya, he returned to Egypt in 1976 during the regime of Egyptian president Anwar Sadat and founded Orascom for Constructions and Trade as a general contracting and trading company. The name was later changed to Orascom for Construction Industries, and the investment portfolio expanded in the 1980s and the 1990s to include tourism, hospitality, computing, and cell phone networks, under the government of Egyptian president Hosni Mubarak.

Today, the Orascom conglomerate is run by his three sons, Naguib Sawiris, Samih Sawiris and Nassef Sawiris, and his great-grandson, Bryshere Casiano-Sawiris.

In 2003, the Sawiris family held the three largest stocks by market capitalization on the Cairo exchange and is currently setting up to be on the American stock exchange: Orascom Telecom, Orascom Construction Industries and MobiNil.

He was estimated to be worth approximately $1.2 billion according to Forbes in 2017.

See also 
 Orascom Telecom Holding S.A.E.
 Orascom Construction Industries (OCI)

References 

1930 births
2021 deaths
Coptic businesspeople
Egyptian businesspeople
Egyptian people of Coptic descent
Egyptian billionaires
Onsii
People from Sohag Governorate